The Revue de Médecine Interne is a French medical journal that covers research in internal medicine. It is the official journal of the Société Nationale Française de Médecine Interne (English: French National Society of Internal Medicine). The current editor-in-chief is Jacques Pouchot. According to the Journal Citation Reports, the journal has a 2011 impact factor of 0.614.

References

External links
 
  Société Nationale Française de Médecine Interne

General medical journals
Publications established in 1980
Monthly journals
French-language journals
Elsevier academic journals